PTV Bolan is a television channel launched by PTV that broadcasts regional programmes in Brahui, Balochi and Pashto. PTV Bolan was launched in 2005 by then Prime Minister. It is primarily targeted towards people living in the Balochistan province of Pakistan.

Availability

This channel also streams online.

References

External links
 PTV Bolan Satellite Information
 PTV Bolan Official Site

Balochi-language television
Pakistan Television Corporation
Television networks in Pakistan
Television stations in Pakistan
Television stations in Islamabad
Mass media in Balochistan, Pakistan
Television channels and stations established in 2005